is the fourth vessel of the s of the Japan Maritime Self-Defense Force (JMSDF).

Design
The hull design is generally based on the one of the Murasame class. However, as a part of weapons was changed, the internal structure has also been changed. And it was said that the large lattice mast was degrading its stealthiness in the Murasame class, so in this class, it was considered to change to two small masts, but it was not implemented.

Although its displacement become slightly increased, there is no change in its main engines, as it is not a big difference that has little effect on the performance of the ship.

Construction and career 
Sazanami was authorized under the Medium-term Defense Buildup Plan of 1996, and was built by Mitsubishi Heavy Industries shipyards in Nagasaki. She was laid down on 4 April 2002, launched on 29 August 2003. She was commissioned into service on 16 February 2005. and was initially assigned to the JMSDF Escort Flotilla 2 based at Sasebo.

Sazanami, along with the fleet oiler Maiyu were assigned to the Indian Ocean in June 2006 to provide assistance in refueling anti-terrorist coalition forces in Afghanistan as part of Operation Enduring Freedom. She returned to Japan in November 2006.

On 24 June 2008, Sazanami was the first JMSDF ship to bring disaster relief to the Chinese port of Zhanjiang following the 2008 Sichuan earthquake. According to China Daily, the Japanese media sent more than 60 reporters to cover the event.

From 14 March 2009, Sazanami, along with the destroyer , was sent to the Gulf of Aden to participate in anti-piracy escort operations and to provide humanitarian assistance. The destroyer was the first of a series of JMSDF vessels deployed in rotation to patrol this region.  Approximately 2,000 merchant ships with ties to Japan, Japan-flagged or operated by Japanese firms pass through the busy shipping channel each year. On 5 April 2009, she responded to a distress call made by a Singaporean-registered tanker, using a LRAD to warn approaching pirates away. She returned to Japan on 16 August 2009.

On 15 March 2011, Sazanami, along with the destroyer , was again dispatched to Aden, Yemen to anti-piracy escort operations off the coast of Somalia.  The destroyer was part of the eighth rotation of JMSDF vessels patrolling in this region. She undertook 28 sorties, returning to Japan on 16 August 2011. During this deployment, Sazanami also made a courtesy port call at Colombo, Sri Lanka.

Sazanami is currently assigned to the Eight Squadron of the JMSDF Escort Flotilla 4 based at Kure, Hiroshima.

Notes

References

 
Saunders, Stephen. IHS Jane's Fighting Ships 2013-2014. Jane's Information Group (2003). 

2003 ships
Takanami-class destroyers
Sazanami (DD-113)